The bacterial species "Pseudomonas melophthora", can be found in the apple maggot, Rhagoletis pomonella. This can be considered a form of symbiosis as, amongst other things, the bacteria has the ability to degrade insecticides and so offers a form of protection to the apple maggot.

References

Pseudomonadales